Beolgyo Station is a railway station in South Korea. It is on the Gyeongjeon Line.

Railway stations in South Jeolla Province